Florence Kahn may refer to:

Florence Prag Kahn (1866–1948), American teacher and politician
Florence Kahn (actress) (1878–1951), American actress and wife of Sir Max Beerbohm

See also 
 Florence Cahn (born 1954), French figure skater